Portrait of the poet Ilarie Voronca is a cubist painting by Victor Brauner, from 1925.

Description 
The painting is an oil on canvas with dimensions  of 109 x 70 centimeters. It is in the collection of the Visual Art Museum, in Galați.

Analysis 
It is a cubist portrait of the Romanian poet Ilarie Voronca. They collaborated on "picto-poèsie." He also had his portrait painted by Robert Delaunay, and Marc Chagall.

References

External links 

1925 paintings
Romanian paintings